Dumb Hundred is an unincorporated community and census-designated place (CDP) in Blair County, Pennsylvania, United States. It was first listed as a CDP prior to the 2020 census.

The CDP is in southern Blair County, in the southwestern part of Taylor Township. It  sits along Pennsylvania Route 867, which leads north  to Roaring Spring and south  to Interstate 99 at St. Clairsville.

Dumb Hundred is in the western part of the Morrisons Cove valley, with Dunning Mountain rising to the west.

Demographics

References 

Census-designated places in Blair County, Pennsylvania
Census-designated places in Pennsylvania